Matando Cabos ("Killing Cabos") is a 2004 Mexican crime comedy film directed by Alejandro Lozano. The film was written by Lozano, along with Tony Dalton and Kristoff Raczynski.

Although the film garnered mixed reviews from critics, it was well received by the public and has since gained a cult following.

Plot

Jaque is in a terrible situation after being caught having sex with the daughter of the dreaded businessman Oscar Cabos; his boss. The day after receiving the most savage beating of his life, Jaque is confronted by Mr. Cabos, who accidentally trips and loses consciousness. Jaque then asks his friend, Mudo, to aid him. Leaving Cabos in his office, a childhood friend that now works as the company's janitor, who was betrayed by Cabos then takes revenge by stealing and wearing Mr. Cabos' valuable clothes. When Jaque and Mudo arrive, Cabos is half naked and they take him to the bathroom while they decide what to do. When Cabos' former friend leaves the building to take his car, he is intercepted by two kidnappers who think he is Cabos, one of whom is actually his own son, who wanted to kidnap Cabos to make him pay for what he did to his father. Meanwhile, in the bathroom, Jaque and Mudo decide, in order to avoid a possible accusation to take Cabos with them and then decide what to do with him, so they flee with him in their car. While leaving the parking lot, they cross roads with the kidnappers, stopping on a street light. Both couples have a body in their respective trunks, and feeling nervous, they smile at each other in order to look casual. Then, they both go opposite directions. While driving, Jaque and Mudo get cut off the road by an impolite bus driver. They confront him in a mid-road stand off and insult each other; Jaque calls the driver "cross-eyed", which makes him remember his tumultuous past, being rejected by everyone, including his fiancé, for being cross-eyed. He gets very angry and rams his bus against Jaque's car and flees. The crash causes the trunk to get stuck, and as a consequence, they cannot get Mr. Cabos out of the car. To aid them, Mudo calls his friend, the legendary pro wrestler Ruben "Mascarita" (who hates being called Mascarita) and his sidekick, Tony "the Cannibal", a man-eating dwarf.

They then agree to go to a bar and there decide that the best plan is throw Cabos' body in his house, as a massive party is taking place that evening, and make him believe he drank himself to unconsciousness. After toasting for the plan to work, a rugby player in the bar recognizes "Mascarita" and calls him by that name. A huge fight "Santo" style takes place. While "Mascarita" takes away all of the students in the table, another group of students from  a billiards table get mad and provoke him again. "Mascarita" prepares for more, but Tony stops him. "Mascarita" understands and tells Jaque and Mudo to leave with him and let Tony do his thing. They are seen outside the bar while noises and shouts are heard from inside. Tony then exits the places, spitting out a ring, taken from one of the students finger, thus explaining the nickname "Cannibal".

Meanwhile, the kidnappers arrive to a girl's house, leaving the abducted tied in a chair with a bag on his head. They now attempt to call Cabos' house and inform his wife that they have him and ask for ransom. However, the maid is confused about the call and hangs up repeated occasions. After the wife takes the phone, she interprets this as an excuse for her husband not to show up at the party, and hangs up again.

After being worn out from the bar fight, "Mascarita", Mudo and Jaque go to the latter's apartment to change clothes for the parties occasion. While Jaque is selecting a presentable shirt, Mudo and "Mascarita" are annoyed by the neighbor's bird and go to the door and complain. They stay a while waiting for an answer. Then Jaque's girlfriend arrives to argue with him for standing her up and not taking her to her father's party. Angrily, she leaves and takes Jaque's car (with Cabos still in it). When Mudo and "Mascarita" finally hear the neighbor's voice, Mudo flips out and starts screaming for him to shut his bird up. The neighbor then opens his door (after unlocking around five locks) and points two Tec-9's at each of their faces. He explains his emotional bondage with the bird and threatens them to not complain again. After that, Jaque tells them to get going.

Ironically, Jaque's girlfriend, Cabos' daughter, is also the kidnapper's ally's friend. She goes to her house and asks her to join her to her father's party. The kidnapper's leader then appears from their hideout and pretends to be her boyfriend, and the three go to Cabos' party.

In the party a series of mix-ups occur, resulting in the dumping of Cabos' friend by mistake and Cabos being left in Jaque's house. He then returns to his house, and finds his wife having sex with Tony. Tony escapes out the window. Cabos chases him and sees his friend lying in the yard, who wakes up to the sight of an angry Cabos and subsequently receives a golf club to the face.

Cast
Tony Dalton
Kristoff Raczyñski
Ana Claudia Talancón
Pedro Armendáriz Jr.
Joaquín Cosio
Raúl Méndez
Gustavo Sánchez Parra
Rocío Verdejo
Silverio Palacios
Jacqueline Voltaire
Pedro Altamirano
Norman Sotolongo
José Ángel Bichir
Alejandro Galán
Mary Paz Mata

Sequel
A sequel, titled Matando Cabos 2: La Máscara del Máscara, was released directly to Prime Video on October 1, 2021. The film, written and directed by Lozano, received mostly negative reviews.

Tony Dalton and Kristoff Raczyñski, co-writers and stars of the first film, were not affiliated with the sequel.

References

External links 
Matando Cabos from Yahoo Movies
 
 
 

2004 films
2000s Spanish-language films
Mexican thriller films
2004 thriller films
2000s Mexican films